The Last Victims is a 2019 political drama film directed by Maynard Kraak. The film was filmed entirely on location in KwaZulu-Natal South Africa and world premiered at the Pan African Film Festival (PAFF) on 8 February 2019. 
The film then opened the Rapid Lion - South African International Film Festival at the historic Market Theater in Johannesburg, South Africa on 1 March 2019. It screened "in competition" with three nominations: Best Feature Film, Best Cinematography (Meekaaeel Adam) and Best Actor in a Leading Role (Sean Cameron Michael). The film was then selected at 40th Durban International Film Festival (DIFF), Durban South Africa. The film is now selected in competition at Knysna Film Festival, Knysna, South Africa & African Movie Academy Awards (AMAA) in Nigeria. The film is nominated in 3 different section at AMAA viz. Best Screenplay (Sean Robert Daniels), Best Editing (Terwadkar Rajiv & Cohen Lorenzo Davids) & Best Sound (Janno Muller).

Plot 

The film follows Dawid, a former member of South Africa's infamous C1 Counter Insurgency death squad, who must atone for his past when he helps one survivor Pravesh search for the bodies of a missing anti-apartheid cell. Unaware that as they hunt for answers, they too are being hunted.

"Notwithstanding that this film is based on real events, it is definitely a uniquely South African story because it’s about a fractured search for reconciliation in the face of a harrowing past that refuses to die out", says Rapid Lion festival director, Eric Miyeni,"It is a great metaphor for today’s South Africa".

Main cast 
Sean Cameron Michael - Dawid
Kurt Egelhof - Pravesh
Marno van der Merwe - Young Dawid
Ashish Gangapersad - Young Pravesh
Grant Swanby - Warren
Wilson Dunster - Francois
Mark Mulder - Wouter
Deon Coetzee - Viaan
Kobus Van Heerden - Young Wouter 
Tumie Ngumla - Young Lwazi
Baby Cele - Old Lwazi
Kira Wilkinson - Alice
Shelley Meskin - Martha
Sasha Stroebel - Luzanne
Caitlin Clerk - Phoebe 
Ferdinand Gernandt - De Beer 
Sam Phillips - TRC Committee Chair

Accolades

References

External links 
 
 The Last Victims at PAFF
The Last Victims premiere at Pan African Film Festival
The Last Victims premieres at PAFF -  Artsvark Presser
 Mystery Thrilled to be filmed in KZN at Press Reader
 Step aside Hollywood, enter KZN’s Dollywood at Film Contact
 SA film The Last Victims to premiere at US film festival at BizCommunity
 SA Movie set for LA festival at Press Reader / Cape Times newspaper
 RapidLion Awards Ceremony Returns To The Festival at Asempa News
Entertainment: The Last Victims (film) - Cape Talk
Entertainment: The Last Victims (film) - Talk 702 Radio
Acclaimed SA film comes to the screen at Durban International Film Festival
The Last Victims wins Best International Film at the Uganda Film Festival
Screening of ‘The Last Victims’ at popular film festival - Rising Sun
Maynard Kraak’s latest film, The Last Victims, to open RapidLion 2019
Sydney South African Film Festival goes Online 
We are Moving Stories "Tokyo Lift-Off Film Festival" 2020 – The Last Victims

2019 films
Films set in Africa
Films shot in KwaZulu-Natal
2019 independent films
2010s English-language films